Matt Aitken  is a special effects artist.

He was nominated at the 82nd Academy Awards for his work on the film District 9. His nomination was shared with Robert Habros, Dan Kaufman and Peter Muyzers. In 2020, he received his second Academy Award nomination for Best Visual Effects on 2019 film, Avengers: Endgame, at the 92nd Academy Awards. His nomination was shared with Dan DeLeeuw, Russell Earl, and Dan Sudick.

Selected filmography

References

External links
 

Living people
Year of birth missing (living people)
Special effects people